Border Security Force (Water/Marine Wing) is one of the special units of Border Security Force of India. It is responsible for patrolling riverine borders in North Bengal frontier, South Bengal frontier, Andaman Nicobar frontier, Tripura - Mizoram & Cachar (TMC) Frontier, Jammu frontier, Punjab frontier and Gujarat frontier of the BSF. The Water Wing guards around 1400 km of a riverine boundary of India. its members are filled either by deputation basis or from special batches of BSF personal trained from National Inland Navigating Institute, Patna.

List of watercraft in Border Security Force (Water Wing)

See also
Indo-Tibetan Border Police (Water Wing)

References

Security in India
Social security in India